is a railway station in the town of Kōta, Aichi Prefecture, Japan, operated by Central Japan Railway Company (JR Tōkai).

Lines
Kōda Station is served by the Tōkaidō Main Line, and is located 318.5 kilometers from the starting point of the line at Tokyo Station.

Station layout
The station has a single island platform connected to the elevated station building by a footbridge. The station building has automated ticket machines, TOICA automated turnstiles and is unattended.

Platforms

Adjacent stations

History
It was upgraded to become a full station and given its present name on September 11, 1908. The JGR became the JNR (Japan National Railway) after World War II. All freight operations were discontinued in 1971. With the privatization of the JNR on April 1, 1987, the station came under the control of JR Central. Automated turnstiles using the TOICA IC Card system came into operation from November 25, 2006.

Station numbering was introduced to the section of the Tōkaidō Line operated JR Central in March 2018; Kōda Station was assigned station number CA50.

Passenger statistics
In fiscal 2017, the station was used by an average of 3978 passengers daily (boarding passengers only).

Surrounding area
Kōta Town Hall

See also
 List of Railway Stations in Japan

References

Bibliography
Yoshikawa, Fumio. Tokaido-sen 130-nen no ayumi. Grand-Prix Publishing (2002) .

External links

Official home page

Railway stations in Japan opened in 1908
Railway stations in Aichi Prefecture
Tōkaidō Main Line
Stations of Central Japan Railway Company
Kōta, Aichi